In August–November 1976, an outbreak of Ebola virus disease occurred in Zaire (now the Democratic Republic of the Congo).

The virus responsible for the initial outbreak, named after the nearby Ebola River, was first thought to be Marburg virus but was later identified as a new type of virus related to the genus Marburgvirus.

A total of 318 cases and 280 deaths (an 88% fatality rate) resulted from this outbreak, which, along with an outbreak in Sudan that had begun a few weeks previously, were the first outbreaks of Ebola ever recorded.

History

The people of north-central Zaire were most heavily affected by this specific epidemic. This area is located within the Bumba Zone in the Equator Region, which consists mostly of tropical rainforests in the biome. In 1976, there were approximately 275,000 people in the entire Bumba Zone, including 35,000 Zaireans.

Three-quarters of Zaire’s population lived in forest villages at that time. Estimates suggest that each of the forest villages had a population of less than 5,000 people; the smallest villages had less than 500 inhabitants. Many of these villages bordered the Zaire River (now the Congo River). The river runs along the border on the south side of the country, which was important in the context of the Ebola epidemic because it separated the areas geographically.

Most of Zaire’s people either hunted or had contact with hunters that were exposed to an array of wild animals. This was considered a possible cause of the epidemic for some time; however, it probably was not. Because the cause of the outbreak was initially unknown, many people with Ebola virus disease were misdiagnosed and/or treated for malaria, yellow fever, and typhoid fever.

Mabalo Lokela, the headmaster of a local school in Yambuku, was the first case of the 1976 outbreak in Zaire. Lokela had toured with a Yambuku mission in August 1976 near the Central African Republic border and along the Ebola River.

Initially, Lokela was diagnosed with malaria at the Yambuku Mission Hospital and was given quinine. However, Lokela returned to the mission hospital on 1 September with a high fever. Rest was recommended, and he returned home to his village of Yalikonde, about one kilometer from the mission complex. By 5 September, Lokela was in a critical condition with profuse bleeding from all orifices, vomiting, acute diarrhea, chest pains, headache, fever, agitation, and confusion. He died shortly afterwards on 8 September.

On 28 August, a second man presented symptoms, claiming he was from the nearby village of Yandongi. He left the hospital on 30 August, as no clear cause could be identified from his symptoms, and was not seen again. On the same day, Yombe Ngongo, a patient at the hospital receiving treatment for anemia, checked out of the hospital and returned to her village. She soon fell seriously ill, and was tended to by her younger sister Euza. Yombe Ngongo died on 7 September, and her sister Euza followed on 9 September.

Soon after Lokela's visit, a number of other cases were presented at the Yambuku Mission Hospital.  A report from the World Health Organization (WHO) noted that "almost all subsequent infections had either received injections at the hospital or had had close contact with another case." Shortly after family members prepared his body for burial, in accordance with local customs, 21 of Lokela's friends and relatives fell seriously ill and 18 later died.

Yambuku Mission Hospital was a remote Catholic hospital and had no doctors or laboratory facilities to aid in diagnosis.  This, as well as a lack of communication capabilities, contributed to the hospital’s isolation from Kinshasa. After the first Ebola virus disease cases, the hospital was unable get more resources until the Minister of Health sent out an International Commission to investigate further. Victims received treatment from four Belgian nuns, a priest, one female nurse from Zaire, and seven male Zaireians.

Urgent pleas for assistance were sent out on 12 September. On 15 September, the first doctor to arrive, Mgoi Mushola, prepared a report in which he noted that none of the many treatments provided met with success. This was the first formal description of Ebola virus disease.

Epidemiology

The International Commission team worked with the nurses for interpreting and processing standardized pre-coded forms. These forms included clinical questionnaires, as well as, many epidemiological features such as: asking for the sex and age of the person and asking to list out relatives that would also fill out a form. Through this form, the team was able to construct a control group to compare with the Ebola patients, by matching similar traits, thus helping them construct their epidemiological study.

The team needed to figure out how this disease was spreading in order to make a plan of attack against the virus.  Because of the uncertainty of the infection route, the team placed a quarantine over the region of the Bumba Zone that was most concerning within two days after the hospital’s closure in October. The motivation for this quick quarantine was largely due to the intense nature of the symptoms and rapid progression of this disease. Unfortunately, there was a lot of resistance from people to help out the team and situation because of the fear associated with the unknown infection route of this disease. Since all of the infection route possibilities were in contention, they had to start narrowing down the potential infection pathways. The team noted that the cases had distinct patterns when drawn out into an epidemic curve that showed a clear correlation between the disease and women between the age of 18 and 25.

The Mission Hospital had only 120 beds available and a staff of just 17 nurses that were directed by a paramedical assistant, not a doctor. This hospital primarily saw patients from the Yandongi sector, but they had also attracted patients from the outer Bumba Zone because this hospital was considered relatively well-stocked and supplied with a good amount of staff for the area. They were already very limited in disease containment abilities because of these factors, but they also generally saw anywhere between 6,000 and 12,000 patients a month for general care. This is another reason why the quarantine was so necessary during the time of the Ebola epidemic at this hospital.

Peter Piot, a microbiologist and physician who investigated the ensuing epidemic, concluded that it was inadvertently caused by the Sisters of Yambuku Mission Hospital, who had given unnecessary vitamin injections to pregnant women in their prenatal clinic without sterilizing the needles and syringes. There were five total syringes and needles that were being used by this nursing staff for multiple days. These medical materials were rinsed between uses with the use of only warm water. Then, at the end of their shift, the nurses would boil the needles and syringes in water, and no other sterilization methods were utilized. This was not an effective enough sterilization process as the Ebola virus was able to be spread from an initial unidentified infected person and spread through this hospital. The International Commission team was able to back up this theory by their epidemiological study showing a correlation between injection history and Ebola cases and then consequently the spreading through person to person.

In all, 318 cases of Ebola were identified in Zaire, and 280 resulted in death. An additional 284 cases and 151 deaths occurred in nearby South Sudan in an unrelated outbreak. Yambuku Mission Hospital was closed after 11 of its 17 staff members died. Belgian nuns serving the community were also infected, and two of them died, along with Mayinga N'Seka, a Zairean nurse, after the group was transported to Kinshasa. With assistance from the WHO, the outbreak was eventually contained by quarantining local villagers in their communities, sterilizing medical equipment, and providing protective clothing to medical personnel. The small Congolese Air Force provided helicopters to allow the outbreak team to visit 550 villages in the area. Cases were documented in 55 of the 550 villages surveyed. The majority of cases were detected in the first four weeks of September, and the last detected probable case died on 5 November 1976.

The table below summarizes the eleven outbreaks that have occurred in the DRC since 1976:

See also

 West African Ebola virus epidemic
 Ebola virus

References

Further reading
 
 

1976 in Zaire
August 1976 events in Africa
Zaire
Ebola
Disease outbreaks in the Democratic Republic of the Congo
Health disasters in Africa